The Cape Fear Memorial Bridge is a steel vertical-lift bridge in North Carolina, USA. It carries US 17/US 76/US 421 across the Cape Fear River between Brunswick County and New Hanover County. It also carried U.S. Route 74 until that designation was shifted to the Isabel S. Holmes Bridge. It has a lift span that can be raised .

History
Construction on the bridge began in 1967 and was completed in 1969. The new bridge included a causeway at both ends and an overpass at the west side of the bridge. Since it opened, it has been the only connection on the south side of downtown Wilmington. A ferry system originally operated from the foot of Market Street to Peter Point. The design of the bridge is a two tower structure with a lift span that is 60 feet above the river, and can be raised to 135 feet to accommodate passing ships. The NC state port of Wilmington is to the south and downtown Wilmington is north of the bridge.

The bridge received new paint in 1986, new decking in 1996 and a new control system in 2007. after the Minneapolis bridge incident, all the cross beams were replaced and another paint job was conducted in 2011, and ended in 2012 after multiple delays. After decades of use, proposals have been made to replace the bridge. It is estimated that, by 2035, over 100,000 cars will pass over the bridge each day. North Carolina Department of Transportation has conducted surveys that the bridge will not be set for that many cars, and a failure could happen if not replaced or majority repaired. The new concepts include a bridge built to the south of the bridge at US 421 and a bridge parallel to the current bridge.

$15 million in work was done on the existing bridge in 2019 and a feasibility study on replacing the bridge followed. A proposal for a toll bridge was presented on June 30, 2021.

Gallery

See also
 Interstate 140 (North Carolina)

References

External links

 

Bridges completed in 1969
Buildings and structures in Brunswick County, North Carolina
Buildings and structures in Wilmington, North Carolina
Vertical lift bridges in the United States
Road bridges in North Carolina
Transportation in Brunswick County, North Carolina
U.S. Route 76
U.S. Route 421
U.S. Route 17
Bridges of the United States Numbered Highway System
U.S. Route 74
Towers in North Carolina
Steel bridges in the United States